Donald Doyle may refer to:
Donald D. Doyle (1915–2011), American politician from California
Don H. Doyle, American historian
Donald V. Doyle (1925–2007), American politician from Iowa